The Lafayette-West Lafayette, Indiana Metropolitan Statistical Area, as defined by the United States Census Bureau, is an area consisting of three counties in Indiana, anchored by the cities of Lafayette and West Lafayette. As of the July 1, 2021, the MSA had an estimated population of 224,709. Metro area population in 2021 is 237,130 and was 235,066 in 2020, a growth of 16% over 2010. In 2010, the Lafayette, Indiana metro area population was 210,297.

Counties
Benton
Carroll
Tippecanoe

Communities

Places with more than 50,000 inhabitants
Lafayette (Principal city)

Places with 25,000 to 50,000 inhabitants
West Lafayette (Principal city)

Places with 1,000 to 5,000 inhabitants
Battle Ground
Dayton
Delphi
Flora
Fowler
Otterbein
Oxford
Shadeland

Places with 500 to 1,000 inhabitants
Boswell
Camden
Clarks Hill

Places with fewer than 500 inhabitants
Ambia
Burlington
Earl Park
Yeoman

Unincorporated places

Townships

Benton County

Carroll County

Tippecanoe County

Demographics
As of the census of 2000, there were 178,541 people, 66,502 households, and 40,652 families residing within the MSA. The racial makeup of the MSA was 90.27% White, 2.14% African American, 0.26% Native American, 3.74% Asian, 0.03% Pacific Islander, 2.29% from other races, and 1.28% from two or more races. Hispanic or Latino of any race were 4.86% of the population.

The median income for a household in the MSA was $40,381, and the median income for a family was $49,625. Males had a median income of $34,515 versus $22,899 for females. The per capita income for the MSA was $18,677.

Combined Statistical Area

The Lafayette–West Lafayette–Frankfort Combined Statistical Area (CSA) is made up of four counties in Indiana. The statistical area includes one metropolitan area and one micropolitan area. As of the 2020 Census, the CSA had a population of 256,906 (though a July 1, 2021 estimate placed the population at 257,774).

Components
Metropolitan Statistical Areas (MSAs)
Lafayette–West Lafayette (Benton, Carroll, and Tippecanoe counties)
Micropolitan Statistical Areas (μSA)
Frankfort (Clinton County)

See also
Indiana census statistical areas

References

 
Benton County, Indiana
Carroll County, Indiana
Tippecanoe County, Indiana